Kembangan may refer to:
In Singapore
Kembangan, Singapore, a residential area within the district of Bedok
Kembangan MRT station, an MRT Station that serves the area
Kampong Kembangan Single Member Constituency, a former constituency that governed the area
In Indonesia
Kembangan, Jakarta, a subdistrict of West Jakarta
North Kembangan, an administrative village (kelurahan) of Kembangan
South Kembangan, an administrative village of Kembangan
Kembangan railway station, a railway station in Kembangan
Kampung Kembangan, a name of several suburban areas